Franco-Spanish War may refer to any war between France and Spain, including:

France–Spain military relations